Osvaldo José Virgil Jr. (born December 7, 1956) is a former Major League Baseball catcher who played with the Philadelphia Phillies, Atlanta Braves and Toronto Blue Jays from 1980 to 1990. His father, Ozzie Sr., was a Major League third baseman and utilityman and longtime coach.

He was selected by the Phillies in the sixth round of the 1976 Major League Baseball Draft, and from 1984–1988 he was a regular catcher in the National League, being elected to the loop's All-Star team twice, in 1985 and in 1987. 

In 1987, Virgil hit a career high 27 home runs with the Braves. In that year's MLB All-Star Game, he was the first player to get a leadoff hit -- in the 13th inning of a scoreless game -- and scored the game's winning run. 

All told, he played in 739 major league games and collected 549 hits, with 98 career home runs.

Years after his playing career was over, Virgil Jr. became a manager, being named manager of the Arizona's Surprise Fightin' Falcons (Arizona) of the independent Golden Baseball League in 2005.

Ozzie Jr. attended Moon Valley High School in Phoenix, Arizona. He set many state records and even forced a taller fence to be erected on the Moon Valley field due to his tendency to use nearby houses as target practice.

In 1978, Virgil was named the Carolina League MVP.

See also
 List of second-generation Major League Baseball players

External links

1956 births
Living people
Atlanta Braves players
Auburn Phillies players
Major League Baseball catchers
Minor league baseball managers
Major League Baseball players from Puerto Rico
National League All-Stars
Oklahoma City 89ers players
Peninsula Pilots players
People from Mayagüez, Puerto Rico
Philadelphia Phillies players
Puerto Rican expatriate baseball players in Canada
Reading Phillies players
Spartanburg Phillies players
St. Petersburg Pelicans players
Syracuse Chiefs players
Tigres de Aragua players
Puerto Rican expatriate baseball players in Venezuela
Toronto Blue Jays players